Germany is traditionally a country organized as a federal state. After the dissolution of the Holy Roman Empire in 1806, the German-speaking territories of the empire became allied in the German Confederation (1815–1866), a league of states with some federalistic elements. After the Austro-Prussian War, Prussia led the Northern states into a federal state called the North German Confederation (1867–1870). The Southern states joined the federal state in 1870/71, which was consequently renamed the German Empire (1871–1918). The state continued as the Weimar Republic (1919–1933).

States of the German Confederation

In 1864, Austria and Prussia together became the new sovereign of Holstein (a member of the confederation) and Schleswig (outside the confederation).

States of the North German Confederation

States of the German Empire

States of the Weimar Republic

See also
 List of former sovereign states
 List of states in the Holy Roman Empire (962–1806)
 States of Germany, about the modern states

Historic

.Germany
German states
States
States
.States